Hocus Pocus, or What's the Hurry, Son? is a 1990 novel by Kurt Vonnegut.

Plot summary
In an editor's note at the beginning of the book, Vonnegut claims to have found hundreds of scraps of paper of varying sizes, from wrapping paper to business cards, sequentially numbered by their author to form a narrative. The breaks between pieces of paper often signal a sort of ironic "punchline".

The main character is Eugene Debs Hartke, a Vietnam War veteran and carillonneur who realizes that he has killed exactly as many people as the number of women he has had sex with. The character's name is an homage to American labor and political leader Eugene V. Debs and anti-war senator Vance Hartke, both from Vonnegut's home state, Indiana. Upon his discharge from the military, Hartke becomes a professor at Tarkington College in the Finger Lakes region of upstate New York, but is later fired for sexual misconduct.

Hartke then becomes a teacher at a private prison in the nearby town of Scipio. The prison is run by a Japanese corporation and overseen by Hartke's occasional acquaintance, Hiroshi Matsumoto. The prison is populated entirely by black inmates, America having been resegregated by both race and class. Hartke sets about teaching the inmates how to read.

After a massive prison break, the escaped inmates occupy Tarkington College and take the staff hostage. With the old prison destroyed in the breakout, Tarkington becomes a prison with Hartke as its warden. When it becomes known that the breakout was led by one of his former students, Hartke is accused of collaboration and becomes an inmate himself.

Film Adaptation
In March 2021, Uri Singer acquired the rights to adapt the novel into a film.

References

1990 American novels
Nonlinear narrative novels
Novels by Kurt Vonnegut
Novels set in New York (state)
Postmodern novels